The  Cherenkov Array at Themis (CAT) imager is an atmospheric Cherenkov imaging telescope for detection of high-energy gamma rays (>200 GeV), sited in the French Pyrenees.

External links
Cherenkov Array at Themis (CAT) on the internet

High energy particle telescopes